The 5th Infantry Division was a regular army infantry division of the British Army. It was established by Arthur Wellesley, 1st Duke of Wellington for service in the Peninsular War, as part of the Anglo-Portuguese Army, and was active for most of the period since, including the First World War and the Second World War and was disbanded soon after. The division was reformed in 1995 as an administrative division covering Wales and the English regions of West Midlands, East Midlands and East. Its headquarters were in Shrewsbury. It was disbanded on 1 April 2012.

Peninsular War
The 5th Division during the Peninsular War under the command of General James Leith was present at most of the major engagements including the Battle of Bussaco, the Battle of Sabugal, the Siege of Almeida, the Battle of Badajoz, the Battle of Salamanca, the Battle of Vitoria, the Siege of San Sebastian, the Battle of Nivelle and the Battle of the Nive.

Peninsular War order of battle 
The order of battle in summer 1813 was:
 1st Brigade
 3/1st (Royal Scots) Regiment of Foot
 1/9th (Norfolk) Regiment of Foot
 1/38th (1st Staffordshire) Regiment of Foot (from June 1812)
 2/38th (1st Staffordshire) Regiment of Foot (to December 1812)
 2/47th (Lancashire) Regiment of Foot (from October 1813)
 1 Coy., Brunswick-Oels Jaegers
 2nd Brigade
 1/4th (King's Own) Regiment of Foot
 2/4th (King's Own) Regiment of Foot (May to December 1812)
 2/30th (Cambridgeshire) Regiment of Foot
 2/44th (East Essex) Regiment of Foot
 2/47th (Lancashire) Regiment of Foot (to October 1813)
 Portuguese Brigade
 1/3rd Infantry Regiment, Portuguese Army
 2/3rd Infantry Regiment, Portuguese Army
 1/15th Infantry Regiment, Portuguese Army
 2/15th Infantry Regiment, Portuguese Army
 8th Caçadores Battalion, Portuguese Army

Waterloo Campaign 

The division was also present during the Waterloo Campaign first seeing action at the Battle of Quatre Bras then at the Battle of Waterloo under the command of Lieutenant General Sir Thomas Picton.

Waterloo order of battle
The division's order of battle at Waterloo was as follows:
 8th British Brigade, Major-General Sir James Kempt
 1/28th (North Gloucestershire) Regiment of Foot
 1/32nd (Cornwall) Regiment of Foot
 79th Regiment of Foot (Cameron Highlanders)
 1/95th Regiment of Foot (Rifles)
 9th British Brigade, Major-General Sir Dennis Pack
 3/1st Regiment of Foot (Royal Scots)
 42nd (Royal Highland) Regiment of Foot "Black Watch"
 2/44th (East Essex) Regiment of Foot
 92nd Regiment of Foot (Gordon Highlanders)
 5th Hanoverian Brigade, Colonel Ernst von Vincke
 Landwehr Battalion Gifhorn
 Landwehr Battalion Hameln
 Landwehr Battalion Hildesheim
 Landwehr Battalion Peine
 Artillery, Major Heinrich Heise
 Roger's Battery, Royal Artillery
 Braun's Battery, Hanoverian Foot Artillery

Second Boer War

The 5th Division under the command of General Sir Charles Warren joined up with the Natal Field Force shortly after the Battle of Colenso and were a part of the relieving army of the besieged Ladysmith.

Second Boer War order of battle
The formation was as follows:
11th Infantry Brigade initially commanded by General Edward Woodgate but he was wounded at Spion Kop and died shortly afterwards. He was succeeded by General Arthur Wynne who was later wounded at the Battle of the Tugela Heights and succeeded by Colonel Walter Kitchener.
 2nd Battalion Kings Own Royal Lancaster's
 2nd Battalion Lancashire Fusiliers
 1st Battalion South Lancashire Regiment
 1st Battalion York and Lancaster Regiment

10th Infantry Brigade commanded by General John Talbot Coke.
 Imperial Light Infantry
 2nd Battalion Dorset Regiment
 2nd Battalion Middlesex Regiment
 2nd Battalion Somerset Light Infantry
 Yorkshire's and Warwickshire's being left at Cape Colony

First World War

The 5th Division was a permanently established Regular Army division that was amongst the first to be sent to France as part of the original British Expeditionary Force (BEF) at the outbreak of the First World War. It served on the Western Front for most of the war except for a brief period on the Italian Front from 27 November 1917 to 1 April 1918. The 5th Division, as a Regular Army formation (one of the Old Contemptibles) fought in many of the major battles of the Western Front from the Battle of Mons in 1914, the later stages of the Somme offensive, including the first battle using tanks, up to the Battle of the Selle in 1918.

Order of battle
The order of battle was as follows:
13th Brigade
The 13th Brigade was temporarily under the command of 28th Division between 23 February and 7 April 1915, when it was replaced by 84th Brigade from that Division.
 2nd Battalion, King's Own Scottish Borderers
 2nd Battalion, Duke of Wellington's Regiment (left January 1916)
 1st Battalion, Queen's Own (Royal West Kent Regiment)
 2nd Battalion, King's Own Yorkshire Light Infantry (left December 1915)
 1/9th (City of London) Battalion (Queen Victoria's), London Regiment (joined November 1914, left February 1915)
 14th (Service) Battalion, Royal Warwickshire Regiment (joined December 1915, became Divisional Pioneers October 1918)
 15th (Service) Battalion, Royal Warwickshire Regiment (joined January 1916, disbanded October 1918)
 16th (Service) Battalion, Royal Warwickshire Regiment (joined October 1918)
 13th Machine Gun Company, Machine Gun Corps (formed 24 December 1915, moved to 5th Battalion, Machine Gun Corps 26 April 1918)
 13th Trench Mortar Battery (formed April 1916)

14th Brigade
The 14th Brigade transferred to 32nd Division on 30 December 1915
 1st Battalion, Devonshire Regiment (left 12 January 1916)
 2nd Battalion, Suffolk Regiment (left September 1914)
 1st Battalion, East Surrey Regiment (left 12 January 1916)
 1st Battalion, Duke of Cornwall's Light Infantry (left 12 January 1916)
 2nd Battalion, Manchester Regiment
 1/5th Battalion, Cheshire Regiment (joined February 1915, left November 1915)
 1/9th (Highlanders) Battalion, Royal Scots (joined November 1915)
 2nd Battalion, Royal Inniskilling Fusiliers (joined November 1915)
 14th Machine Gun Company, Machine Gun Corps (formed December 1915, moved to 5th Battalion, Machine Gun Corps 26 April 1918)
 14th Trench Mortar Battery (formed April 1916)

15th Brigade
The 15th Brigade was temporarily under the command of 28th Division between 3 March and 7 April 1915, when it was replaced by 83rd Brigade from that division.
 1st Battalion, Norfolk Regiment
 1st Battalion, Bedfordshire Regiment
 1st Battalion, Cheshire Regiment
 1st Battalion, Dorset Regiment (left December 1915)
 1/6th Battalion, Cheshire Regiment (joined December 1914, left March 1915)
 1/6th (Rifle) Battalion, The King's (Liverpool) Regiment (joined February 1915, left November 1915)
 16th (Service) Battalion, Royal Warwickshire Regiment (joined December 1915, left October 1918)

95th Brigade
95th Brigade transferred from 32nd Division on 26 December 1915
 12th (Service) Battalion, Gloucestershire Regiment (Bristol's Own) (joined December 1915, disbanded October 1918)
 1st Battalion, Devonshire Regiment (joined January 1916)
 1st Battalion, East Surrey Regiment (joined January 1916)
 1st Battalion, Duke of Cornwall's Light Infantry (joined January 1916)

Artillery
 XV Brigade, Royal Field Artillery
 XXVII Brigade, Royal Field Artillery
 XXVIII Brigade, Royal Field Artillery (until 21 January 1917)
 VIII (Howitzer) Brigade, Royal Field Artillery (until 21 May 1916)
 108th Heavy Battery, Royal Garrison Artillery (until 9 April 1915)

Engineers
 17th Field Company, Royal Engineers (until 26 March 1915)
 59th Field Company, Royal Engineers
 1st South Midland Field Company, Royal Engineers (from 24 March until 10 April 1916)
 2/1st North Midland Field Company, Royal Engineers (from 23 March until 19 May 1915)
 1/2nd Home Counties Field Company, Royal Engineers (joined 2 February 1915; became 491st (Home Counties) Field Company 3 February 1917)
 2nd Durham Field Company, Royal Engineers (joined 20 September 1916; became 527th (Durham) Field Company 3 February 1917)

Pioneers
 6th Battalion, Argyll and Sutherland Highlanders (from 13 June 1916 until 5 October 1918)
 14th (Service) Battalion, Royal Warwickshire Regiment (from 5 October 1918)

Insignia
The 5th Division was unusual among other British divisions in that no battle patches were worn on their tunics or helmets, aside from those briefly worn by New Army battalions bringing them from their former division.

Interwar period
During the interwar period, the division spent time based in Egypt and then in Palestine. The latter occurred during the 1936–1939 Arab revolt in Palestine.

Second World War

Upon the outbreak of the Second World War, in September 1939, the 5th Infantry Division was a Regular Army formation, commanded by Major-General Harold Franklyn, who had been in command since 1938. The division was based at Catterick under Northern Command. Both of its infantry brigades (the 13th and 15th) went to France to join the rest of the British Expeditionary Force (BEF) in early October 1939 as independent infantry brigades, but the divisional Headquarters crossed to France on 19 December 1939, coming under the command of Lieutenant-General Alan Brooke's II Corps from 23 December. By the new year of 1940 the division was reformed with three infantry brigades –the 13th, 15th and 17th, all commanded by men who would achieve high rank in the next few years. The 13th was commanded by Brigadier Miles Dempsey, the 15th by Brigadier Horatio Berney-Ficklin, and the 17th by Brigadier Montagu Stopford.

Globe Trotting

Throughout the early months of 1940 the division saw some changing of units, as the Territorial Army (TA) divisions began to arrive in France from the United Kingdom. This was part of official BEF policy, based on experience from the Great War, and was intended to strengthen the inexperienced TA formations with experienced Regulars, although at the same time diluting the strength of the Regular divisions with inexperienced TA units. Despite this, the division still maintained its integrity as a Regular formation. The next few months were spent in training, although this was hampered by severe shortages of modern equipment. Due to the lack of immediate action many soldiers believed the war would amount to very little. Despite this, morale in the division was high. This period of inactivity was known as the "Phoney War".

In mid-April the 15th Brigade was sent to Norway and fought, very briefly, in the unsuccessful Norwegian campaign, evacuating from there and arriving in the United Kingdom in early May, although it did not rejoin the 5th Division until 3 July 1940. In early May the 25th Infantry Brigade came temporarily under command of the division in France. The German Army launched its attack in the West on 10 May 1940 and the 5th Division saw action in the battles of Belgium and France in May–June 1940 including the Battle of Arras, supported by the 1st Army Tank Brigade, on 21 May 1940 and at the Battle of the Ypres-Comines Canal from 26 to 28 May 1940, and then was withdrawn to Dunkirk, along with the rest of the BEF, where they were evacuated to England, with most of the division arriving on 1 June. Lieutenant-General Brooke, commanding II Corps, wrote in his diary that there "is no doubt that the 5th Div in its fight on the Ypres-Comines canal saved the II Corps and the BEF".

The division, having sustained very heavy losses, remained in the United Kingdom for the next 21 months, with most of 1940 being spent in Scotland under Scottish Command, reforming in numbers and being brought up to strength with large numbers of conscripts, alongside training in anti-invasion duties and preparing for Operation Sea Lion, the German invasion of the United Kingdom which never arrived. In late March 1941 the division, now under the command of Major-General Horatio Berney-Ficklin, who had taken over in July 1940 (and previously commanded the 15th Brigade), was sent to Northern Ireland, coming under command of Lieutenant-General James Marshall-Cornwall's III Corps, under overall control of British Troops Northern Ireland, and, as in Scotland, continued training to repel a German invasion there (see Operation Green).

The division left Northern Ireland on 16 March 1942 and served and travelled in so many regions of the world that they were known as the Globe Trotters, and became the most travelled division of the British Army during the Second World War. In April 1942 the 13th and 17th Infantry Brigades and a portion of the divisional troops were detached to 'Force 121' for Operation Ironclad, the invasion of Vichy French held Madagascar. The division was not complete again until August 1942. It was sent from the United Kingdom to India for three months and then to Middle East Command, where it spent time under the command of British III Corps, now under Lieutenant-General Desmond Anderson, as part of the British Tenth Army, under overall control of Persia and Iraq Command, where it trained in mountain warfare.

In mid-February 1943 the division was sent to Syria, remaining there for the next four months, and later Egypt, where it came under the command of British XIII Corps, commanded by Lieutenant-General Miles Dempsey (who earlier had commanded the 13th Brigade in France and Belgium in 1940), which was part of the British Eighth Army, under General Sir Bernard Montgomery. The division, serving again alongside the 50th Division, began training in amphibious operations in preparation for Operation Husky, the Allied invasion of Sicily.

Sicily, Italy and North-Western Europe

The 5th Division saw action during the invasion of Sicily where, towards the end of the campaign, in early August, the divisional commander, Major-General Berney-Ficklin, who had commanded the division since July 1940, was replaced by Major-General Gerard Bucknall. The division was pulled out of the line and absorbed replacements, and invaded the Italian mainland in Operation Baytown on 3 September (four years since Britain's entry into the war), still as part of XIII Corps of the Eighth Army, but now serving alongside the 1st Canadian Infantry Division, and advanced up the spine of Italy. Later in the year, the division fought in the Moro River Campaign, although sustaining relatively light casualties in comparison to the other Allied formations involved.

Progress for the Allied Armies in Italy (AAI), commanded by General Sir Harold Alexander, towards the end of 1943 had slowed down considerably, due mainly to a combination of worsening weather, stiffening German resistance and the Winter Line (also known as the Gustav Line, a series of formidable defences the Germans had created). The Eighth Army, operating on the Adriatic coast, had already pierced the Gustav Line at its eastern end. However, the appalling weather conditions forbade further progress and so operations there were closed down. As a result, the relatively intact 5th Division was available elsewhere. Therefore, in early January 1944 the division was transferred from the Eighth Army, now under Lieutenant-General Sir Oliver Leese, to the western side of Italy to join Lieutenant-General Richard McCreery's British X Corps. X Corps, stationed along the Garigliano river, was part of Lieutenant General Mark W. Clark's U.S. Fifth Army at the time. The division, now commanded by Major-General Philip Gregson-Ellis after Bucknall returned to the United Kingdom to command XXX Corps, and with the veteran 201st Guards Brigade under command, crossed the Garigliano river as part of the First Battle of Monte Cassino, where it gained considerable territory.

In March 1944 the division, after holding its positions that it gained during the battle, was transferred again, this time to the Anzio bridgehead (or, more appropriately, beachhead) where they came under command of Major General Lucian Truscott's U.S. VI Corps and relieved the battered 56th Division, which was returning to the Middle East. Although by this time the major battles for the Anzio beachhead were over, the division was involved in minor skirmishing and operating in conditions more reminiscent of the trench warfare of the First World War. In May the division participated in Operation Diadem and the breakout from Anzio, which led to the capture of the Italian capital of Rome in early June. During the fighting, Sergeant Maurice Rogers of the 2nd Battalion, Wiltshire Regiment was posthumously awarded the Victoria Cross, the first and only to be awarded to the 5th Division during the Second World War. Soon afterwards the division, having sustained just under 3,000 casualties since its arrival at Anzio three months before, was then withdrawn to Palestine, arriving there in mid-July. The division came under command of Persia and Transjordan Command.

The division, now commanded by the relatively young Major-General Richard Hull, who, at the age of 37, was the youngest division commander in the British Army (and later destined to become Chief of the General Staff and Chief of the Defence Staff), returned to Italy in early 1945 where they relieved the 1st Infantry Division, which had fought alongside the Globetrotters at Anzio. Soon afterwards, however, the division was transferred to the Western Front in March 1945 to participate in the final stages of the North West Europe campaign. Arriving in Belgium just after the British crossing of the Rhine, the division came under command of VIII Corps, under Lieutenant-General Evelyn Barker, part of the British Second Army, under Lieutenant-General Miles Dempsey, and took part in the Western Allied invasion of Germany, closely supported by elements of the 6th Guards Armoured Brigade.

Throughout the Second World War, the British 5th Infantry Division used a 'Y' on a khaki background as its insignia.

Order of battle
The 5th Infantry Division was constituted as follows during the war:
13th Infantry Brigade (detached to Force 121 in Madagascar from 26 April until 2 August 1942)
 2nd Battalion, Cameronians (Scottish Rifles)
 2nd Battalion, Royal Inniskilling Fusiliers (30 November 1939 to 14 August 1944)
 2nd Battalion, Wiltshire Regiment
 13th Infantry Brigade Anti-Tank Company (from 3 September 1939, disbanded 6 January 1941)
 5th Battalion, Essex Regiment (from 14 August 1944)
 13th Infantry Brigade Support Company (from 4 May 1943, left 20 June 1944)

15th Infantry Brigade
 1st Battalion, Green Howards
 1st Battalion, King's Own Yorkshire Light Infantry
 1st Battalion, York and Lancaster Regiment
 15th Infantry Brigade Anti-Tank Company (formed 29 September 1939, disbanded 6 January 1941)
 15th Infantry Brigade Support Company (from 4 May 1943, left 14 June 1944)

17th Infantry Brigade (Brigade HQ formed 3 October 1939, detached to Force 121 in Madagascar from 15 March to 30 June 1942)
 2nd Battalion, Royal Scots Fusiliers (from 4 October 1939)
 2nd Battalion, Seaforth Highlanders (from 4 October 1939, left 30 March 1940)
 2nd Battalion, Northamptonshire Regiment (from 5 October 1939)
 17th Infantry Brigade Anti-Tank Company (formed 18 October 1939, disbanded 6 January 1941)
 6th Battalion, Seaforth Highlanders (from 30 March 1940)
 17th Infantry Brigade Support Company (from 4 May 1943, left 6 June 1944)

Divisional Troops
 7th Battalion, Cheshire Regiment (machine gun battalion, from 11 November 1941)
 3rd Battalion, Tower Hamlets Rifles (Rifle Brigade (The Prince Consort's Own)) (Reconnaissance Battalion, from 15 to 29 January 1941)
 5th Reconnaissance Battalion, Reconnaissance Corps (from 30 January 1941, redesignated 5th Regiment 6 June 1942, became 5th Reconnaissance Regiment, Royal Armoured Corps 1 January 1944)
 9th Field Regiment, Royal Artillery (until 7 April 1942)
 91st (4th London) Field Regiment, Royal Artillery (until 26 April 1942, and again from 2 July 1942)
 92nd (5th London) Field Regiment, Royal Artillery (left 30 April 1940, returned 6 June 1940)
 97th (Kent Yeomanry) Army Field Regiment, Royal Artillery (from 14 to 31 May 1940)
 156th (Lanarkshire Yeomanry) Field Regiment, Royal Artillery (from 29 August 1942)
 52nd (6th London) Anti-Tank Regiment, Royal Artillery (from 28 December 1939)
 18th Light Anti-Aircraft Regiment, Royal Artillery (from 5 February 1943)
 245th (Welsh) Field Company, Royal Engineers (from 29 December 1939) 252nd (West Lancashire) Field Company, Royal Engineers (from 29 December 1939) 506th Field Company, Royal Engineers (until 29 January 1940)
 38th Field Company, Royal Engineers (from 29 January 1940 until 7 April 1942, and again from 30 June 1942)
 254th (West Lancashire) Field Park Company, Royal Engineers (from 29 December 1939) 18th Bridging Platoon, Royal Engineers (from 16 March 1943)
 5th Divisional Signals Regiment, Royal Corps of Signals

 Post Second World War 
The 5th Division was disbanded in 1947 and was reformed briefly from the 7th Armoured Division in Germany on 16 April 1958, with the 7th and 20th Armoured brigades but was then redesignated the 1st Armoured Division on 30 June 1960. It was again reformed in the United Kingdom on 1 April 1968, under Army Strategic Command, incorporating the 2nd, 8th, and 39th brigades, but disbanded in 1970.

1995-2012

The 5th Division was reformed as an administrative division – effectively a military district – from Wales and Western Districts on 1 April 1995. It had its permanent headquarters at the Copthorne Barracks in Shrewsbury, Shropshire. It additionally inherited the units that had formerly made up South West District, that is, Headquarters Salisbury Plain Area and 43rd (Wessex) Brigade from 3rd Division on 1 April 1999.

By 2000 the division comprised the following Regional Brigades:
43rd (Wessex) Brigade
143rd (West Midlands) Brigade
160th (Wales) Brigade

Following further reshuffling, 43rd (Wessex) Brigade was transferred to 4th Division on 1 April 2007 and 49th (East) Brigade came under the command of the 5th Division from 1 April 2007.

The Division reported to Army Headquarters at Andover from 2010. The new HQ Support Command in Aldershot began operation in January 2012 when HQ 4th Division in Aldershot disbanded. HQ 2nd Division in Edinburgh and HQ 5th Division in Shrewsbury were both disbanded in April 2012.

See also

 List of commanders of the British 5th Division
 List of British divisions in World War I
 List of British divisions in World War II
 British Army Order of Battle (September 1939)

 Notes 

Sources
 A.F. Becke,History of the Great War: Order of Battle of Divisions, Part 1: The Regular British Divisions, London: HM Stationery Office, 1934/Uckfield: Naval & Military Press, 2007, .
 
 Norman E.H. Litchfield, The Territorial Artillery 1908–1988 (Their Lineage, Uniforms and Badges)'', Nottingham: Sherwood Press, 1992, .

Further reading 
 A Guide to Appointments and Invitations for High Commissions & Embassies in London, UK Ministry of Defence, June 2006 Edition
 Gregory Blaxland, The Regiments Depart: A History of the British Army 1945–70, William Kimber, London, 1971.
 Reader's Digest, The World At Arms, 1989

External links 
 British Army Order of Battle 1939 – 1945
 The British Army in the Great War: The 5th Division

 5 Infantry Division (1943–45)
 The Royal Artillery 1939–45

Infantry divisions of the British Army in World War I
Italian front (World War I)
Infantry divisions of the British Army in World War II
Military units and formations established in 1810
Military units and formations established in 1814
Military units and formations established in 1899
Military units and formations established in 1902
Military units and formations established in 1919
Military units and formations established in 1929
Military units and formations established in 1958
Military units and formations established in 1968
Military units and formations established in 1995
Military units and formations in Shrewsbury
Military units and formations in Shropshire
Organisations based in Shropshire